Couple or Trouble (lit. Fantasy Couple) is a 2006 South Korean television series loosely based on the 1987 Hollywood film Overboard. Starring Han Ye-seul and Oh Ji-ho, it aired on MBC from October 14 to December 3, 2006 on Saturdays and Sundays at 21:40 for 16 episodes. The romantic comedy series was popular in the ratings, and received recognition at the MBC Drama Awards.

Plot
Anna Jo (Han Ye-seul) is a rude, spoiled, arrogant and impossible-to-please American-bred heiress. She returns to Korea only to continue being a controlling wife to her already cowardly husband, Billy Park (Kim Sung-min). When her yacht gets stuck for repairs, she hires local handyman Jang Chul-soo (Oh Ji-ho) to fix her shower, but when they have a heated spat over her dissatisfaction with his work and refusal to pay, she pushes him overboard and dunks his tools into the ocean right along with him. Later, after a quarrel with Billy that threatens to end their marriage, she herself gets drunkenly pitched overboard and falls victim to a bad case of amnesia.

In the hospital, she ends up beside none other than Chul-soo, who's still recovering from his own swim in the ocean for his lost tools. Unknown to her, he's been raising his three orphaned nephews in their unkempt house and desperately needs a nanny. Taking advantage of her memory loss, he manages to convince her that she's his live-in girlfriend and renames her Na Sang-shil. But he didn't expect her spoiled selfishness to slowly turn into compassion. And he didn't expect to fall overboard again — this time, for her.

Cast

Main characters
Han Ye-seul as Anna Jo / Na Sang-shil 
Oh Ji-ho as Jang Chul-soo 
Kim Sung-min as Billy Park
Park Han-byul as Oh Yoo-kyung

Supporting characters
Kim Kwang-kyu as Department head Gong 
Kim Jung-wook as Ha Deok-gu
Lee Mi-young as Oh Kye-joo
Jung Soo-young as Kang-ja
Lee Suk-min as Jang Joon-seok
Kim Tae-yoon as Jang Yoon-seok
Park Joon-mok as Jang Geun-seok
Lee Sang-yi as Shim Hyo-jung

Awards and nominations
 2006 MBC Drama Awards
 Drama of the Year
 Excellence Award, Actress: Han Ye-seul
 Popularity Award, Actress: Han Ye-seul
 Popularity Award, Actor: Oh Ji-ho
 Best Couple: Oh Ji-ho and Han Ye-seul
 Nomination - Excellence Award, Actor: Oh Ji-ho

 2007 43rd Baeksang Arts Awards
 Popularity Award (TV): Han Ye-seul
 Nomination - Best Actress (TV): Han Ye-seul
 Nomination - Best New Director (TV): Kim Sang-ho
 Nomination - Best Screenplay (TV): Hong Jung-eun, Hong Mi-ran

Ratings

References

External links 
Couple or Trouble official MBC website 

MBC TV television dramas
2006 South Korean television series debuts
2006 South Korean television series endings
Korean-language television shows
South Korean romantic comedy television series
Television shows written by the Hong sisters
Live action television shows based on films